Whyalla railway station was the terminus station of the Whyalla line serving the South Australian city of Whyalla.

History
Whyalla station was opened on 6 October 1972 by Prime Minister William McMahon at the same time as the Whyalla line.

Services
When it opened, the station was served by a daily service from Adelaide operated by CB class railcars. The service was withdrawn in 1975.

On 21 April 1986, the service was reintroduced as the Iron Triangle Limited. It was withdrawn on 31 December 1990 when Australian National withdrew all its South Australian passenger services. The station was demolished in 2012.

References

External links
Railpage - Discussions on Whyalla Railway Station
Scott Morrison Announces National Passenger Rail proposal for Australia
Johnny's Pages gallery

Disused railway stations in South Australia
Railway stations in Australia opened in 1972
Railway stations closed in 1990
Whyalla